The Blish-Garret House is a historic house located in Barnstable, Massachusetts.

Description and history 
This -story Cape style house was built c. 1760, and is a rare well-preserved instance of a Georgian colonial period Cape. It is slightly unusual in that it is a half-house, only three bays wide, which was never widened to the typical five bays. The main entry is simply framed, with a transom window. The first documented owner was Jonathan Blish; it was later owned by Andrew Garrett, for whom Garrett Pond is named.

The house was listed on the National Register of Historic Places in 1987.

See also
National Register of Historic Places listings in Barnstable County, Massachusetts

References

Houses in Barnstable, Massachusetts
National Register of Historic Places in Barnstable, Massachusetts
Houses on the National Register of Historic Places in Barnstable County, Massachusetts
Houses completed in 1760
Georgian architecture in Massachusetts